XHGVE-FM is a noncommercial radio station on 94.5 FM in Guasave, Sinaloa, Mexico. It is owned by Sinaloa, Arte y Gloria, A.C., a non-profit owned by Román Padilla Fierro and Aldo Prandini (AP Grupo Radio), and known as La Interesante de Guasave.

History
XHGVE received its concessions on November 11, 2015, and came to air in October 2016.

References

Spanish-language radio stations
Radio stations in Sinaloa
2016 establishments in Mexico
Radio stations established in 2016